En with tail (Ӊ ӊ; italics: Ӊ ӊ) is a letter of the Cyrillic script. Its form is derived from the Cyrillic letter En (Н н) by adding a tail to the right leg. Its form is not to be confused with the En with descender (Ң ң).

En with tail is used only in the alphabet of the Kildin Sami language where it represents the voiceless alveolar nasal .

Computing codes

See also
Ң ң : Cyrillic letter En with descender
Ӈ ӈ : Cyrillic letter En with hook
Ҥ ҥ : Cyrillic ligature En Ge
Cyrillic characters in Unicode

Cyrillic letters with diacritics
Letters with hook